The Central Delta languages are spoken in Rivers State and Bayelsa State, Nigeria. Ogbia is the most populous, with over 200,000 speakers.

The languages are Abua–Odual, Ogbia, Kugbo, Abureni, Obulom, O’chi’chi’, Ogbogolo, Ogbronuagum.

Names and locations
Below is a list of language names, populations, and locations from Blench (2019).

References

Blench, Roger. 2008. The Central Delta languages: comparative word list and historical reconstructions.

 
Cross River languages